John Banister may refer to:

John Banister (anatomist) (1533–1610), English anatomist
John Banister (composer) (1630–1679), English composer
John Banister (naturalist) (1654–1692), English clergyman and natural scientist
John Banister (lawyer) (1734–1788), American delegate in the Continental Congress
John Riley Banister (1854–1918), American law officer and Texas Ranger
John Bright Banister (1880–1938), British obstetric physician

See also
John Bannister (disambiguation)